The Marie Skłodowska-Curie Medallion is one panel from a set of four created by Jozef C. Mazur. It honors Marie Curie and currently resides in the Polish Room at the University at Buffalo Libraries.

History
On August 3, 1955, the University at Buffalo created the Polish Room. Polish-American artist Jozef C. Mazur was hired to plan and decorate the room. Items included a set of four stained-glass medallions depicting famous Poles. 

At some point between the founding and when the Polish Room was moved in 1978, the medallions went missing. In 2007 the Marie Skłodowska-Curie Medallion was found for sale on eBay by University at Buffalo alumnus Gregory Witul. Witul was able to coordinate the return of the medallion to the University. A formal re-dedication was held on November 4, 2007. 

On April 6, 2008 Witul received the Am-Pol Eagle Citizen of the Year Award for Heritage for finding and coordinating the return of the medallion and Peter Miecyjak received the Am-Pol Eagle Citizen of the Year Award for Youth in part for organizing the re-dedication.

References

Polish-American history
Stained glass windows
Cultural depictions of Marie Curie